The Swiss Hitparade is Switzerland's main music sales charts. The charts are a record of the highest-selling singles and albums in various genres in Switzerland.

The Swiss charts include:

 Singles Top 75 (released since 1968)
 Singles Top 100
 Albums Top 100 (released since late 1983)
 Compilations Top 25
 Airplay Top 30

Since 2010, Hitparade's compiler Media Control has also set up Les charts, a record chart of the highest-selling singles and albums in Romandie, the Francophone region of Switzerland:

 Romandie Singles Top 20 (discontinued)
 Romandie Albums Top 50

The charts are updated weekly on Sundays, and are posted publicly on the preceding Wednesday mornings.

See also
List of number-one singles in Switzerland

References

External links
Schweizer Hitparade
Les Charts (Romandie)

Record charts
Swiss music